Chhabi Biswas (ছবি বিশ্বাস) former politician of Communist Party of Bangladesh who is currently Bangladesh Awami League politician and the former Member of Parliament from Netrokona-1.

Early life
Biswas was born on 26 May 1951.

Career
Biswas's political career started as a member of Communist Party of Bangladesh. He participated in the general election of 1991 in Netrokona-1 constituency from Communist Party of Bangladesh and got 3,918 votes which is 3.8% of total votes cast at that time.
Later on, He joined Bangladesh Awami League
Biswas was elected to Parliament on 5 January 2014 from Netrokona-1 as a Bangladesh Awami League candidate and served till 30 December 2018. In December 2014, he was assaulted in Dhaka Medical College and Hospital by Bangladesh Nationalist Party activists and his car was burned down.

References

Awami League politicians
Living people
1951 births
10th Jatiya Sangsad members